Kevin Forrest (born November 3, 1984 in Seattle, Washington) is a retired American soccer player.

Career

Youth and College
Forrest grew up in Edmonds, Washington, and began his career with various youth soccer teams in the Seattle area, including Emerald City FC, and the Crossfire Sounders, where he was coached by former Seattle Sounders coach Alan Hinton. Forrest attended Edmonds-Woodway High School, and played college soccer at the University of Washington, scoring 34 goals and earning All American and Pac-10 honors including Pac-10 Player of the Year in 2006.  He medical redshirted the 2005 season with the onset of plantar fasciitis. His final season, 2007, was cut short despite a promising beginning when he suffered a season ending stress fracture.

During his college years Forrest also played for Hibernian & Caledonian in the Pacific Coast Soccer League winning a USASA national championship in 2005.

Professional
Forrest was drafted by Colorado Rapids with the third pick of the 2008 MLS Supplemental Draft, but was suffering from another stress fracture in pre-season training, and was eventually released by the Rapids on March 3, 2008. On July 31, 2008, Forrest signed with the Seattle Sounders of the USL First Division for the remainder of the season, and subsequently played in nine games for the team.

On 24 March 2009, Forrest signed a contract with MLS expansion team Seattle Sounders FC for the 2009 season after the Sounders acquired his rights from the Rapids. He made no league appearances but played in one US Open Cup game, scoring against his former team Colorado Rapids in a 1–0 victory. On July 2, 2009, Forrest started a game for the Portland Timbers against Bayern Munich II.  He scored the game's first goal in the 8th minute and the Timbers signed him to a contract for the remainder of the 2009 season, and he subsequently played in the 10 remaining games for the team on the way to their league title and record 23-game unbeaten streak.  He recorded the game-winning assist against eventual champions Montreal Impact in regular season play.

Forrest signed with Washington Crossfire of the USL Premier Development League for the 2010 season. He also coached two teams at the Crossfire Premier youth soccer club.

Personal
Kevin is the son of former Seattle Sounders player Ward Forrest. Kevin's mother, Theresa Mead Forrest, was a member of the first women's soccer team in Seattle, and she met her husband Ward when he was her coach.  Kevin has two older sisters, Cathleen and Julie, and one younger sister, Madeleine.  Julie played four years of college soccer and was captain of the team at Portland State University.  The Forrests have a yellow lab named Bailey who is also considered a part of the family.

Honors

Portland Timbers
USL First Division Commissioner's Cup (1): 2009

References

External links
 Washington Huskies bio

1984 births
Living people
American soccer players
Pacific Coast Soccer League players
Seattle Hibernian players
Seattle Sounders (1994–2008) players
Seattle Sounders FC players
Portland Timbers (2001–2010) players
Washington Crossfire players
USL First Division players
USL League Two players
Colorado Rapids draft picks
Soccer players from Washington (state)
University of Washington alumni
Washington Huskies men's soccer players
People from Edmonds, Washington
Association football forwards